Currituck National Wildlife Refuge, located on the northern end of North Carolina's Outer Banks, was established in 1984 to preserve and protect the coastal barrier island ecosystem. Refuge lands are managed to provide wintering habitat for waterfowl and to protect endangered species such as piping plover, sea turtles, and seabeach amaranth.

Habitat types common to most barrier islands are found on the refuge. Moving westward from the Atlantic Ocean to Currituck Sound, these habitats include sandy beaches, grassy dunes, interdunal wetlands (flats), maritime forests and shrub thickets. Currituck Sound's shoreline is made up of brackish water marshes and occasionally, mudflats that have been exposed by wind tides. A few forested islands also exist on the refuge. Monkey Island, a noted bird rookery, provides nesting habitat to several species of wading birds. It is also currently the most northerly known native habitat of the Sabal minor palm.  In addition to Sabal palms, vegetation within these diverse habitat types include several varieties of beach grasses, live oak, loblolly pine, wax myrtle, cattails, sedges and rushes, black needlerush (Juncus roemerianus) and giant cordgrass (Spartina cynosuroides).

Various types of wading birds, shorebirds, waterfowl, raptors, mammals (including feral horses), reptiles, and amphibians common to the eastern United States, are found on the refuge. The endangered piping plover and loggerhead sea turtle sometimes nest on refuge beaches and dunes.

Climate

According to the Trewartha climate classification system, Currituck National Wildlife Refuge, North Carolina has a humid subtropical climate with hot and humid summers, cool winters and year-around precipitation (Cfak). Cfak climates are characterized by all months having an average mean temperature > 32.0 °F (> 0.0 °C), at least eight months with an average mean temperature ≥ 50.0 °F (≥ 10.0 °C), at least one month with an average mean temperature ≥ 71.6 °F (≥ 22.0 °C) and no significant precipitation difference between seasons. During the summer months in Currituck National Wildlife Refuge, a cooling afternoon sea breeze is present on most days, but episodes of extreme heat and humidity can occur with heat index values ≥ 100 °F (≥ 38 °C). Currituck National Wildlife Refuge is prone to hurricane strikes, particularly during the Atlantic hurricane season which extends from June 1 through November 30, sharply peaking from late August through September. During the winter months, episodes of cold and wind can occur with wind chill values < 10 °F (< -12 °C). The plant hardiness zone in Currituck National Wildlife Refuge is 8a with an average annual extreme minimum air temperature of 14.2 °F (-9.9 °C). The average seasonal (Dec-Mar) snowfall total is < 2 inches (< 5 cm), and the average annual peak in nor'easter activity is in February.

Ecology

According to the A. W. Kuchler U.S. potential natural vegetation types, Currituck National Wildlife Refuge, North Carolina would have a dominant vegetation type of Northern Cordgrass (73) with a dominant vegetation form of Coastal Prairie (20).

References
Refuge website

National Wildlife Refuges in North Carolina
Protected areas of Currituck County, North Carolina
Protected areas established in 1984
Wetlands of North Carolina
Landforms of Currituck County, North Carolina